North of 60 is a 1990s Canadian television drama depicting life in the sub-Arctic northern boreal forest (north of 60° north latitude, hence the title). It first aired on CBC Television in 1992 and was syndicated around the world. It is set in the fictional community of Lynx River, a Canadian Indigenous community depicted as being in the Dehcho Region, Northwest Territories.

Most of the characters were Dene. Some non-native characters had important roles: the restaurant/motel owner (a Ukrainian immigrant), the band manager, the nurse (a white Canadian woman) and (during the show's first season) the town's RCMP Detachment Commander. The show explored themes of Native poverty, alcoholism, cultural preservation, conflict over land settlements, and natural resource exploitation.

Originally somewhat light-hearted (a CBC response to the very successful Northern Exposure on CBS), it quickly became a more sombre dramatic series which explored subplots including murder, band corruption, economic depression, mental health and the death of a child (owing to actress Selina Hanuse, who played Hannah Kenidi, leaving the show to pursue her education in Season 3). There were also romantic and sexual subplots between unlikely characters, giving the show a distinctive soap opera-like atmosphere not hugely common in Canadian government-sponsored media at the time. This included scenes depicting brief sex, nudity and profanity, as well as discussion in one episode about HIV/AIDS and the social stigma faced by a young boy who was a male prostitute with the disease.

Casting
Starring in the series were Tina Keeper as RCMP Constable, later Corporal, Michelle Kenidi, Tracey Cook as Sarah Birkett (nurse during first year), Tom Jackson as Peter Kenidi (band chief in first year, Michelle's brother), Gordon Tootoosis as Albert Golo (bootlegger, then band chief), Dakota House as Trevor 'Teevee' Tenia (teen trouble-maker, then band chief), Lubomir Mykytiuk as Gerry Kisilenko (restaurant/motel owner/justice of the peace), Jimmy Herman as Joe Gomba (elder) and Simon R. Baker as Charlie Muskrat. Adam Beach and Tantoo Cardinal also starred. Elsie Tsa Che (Wilma Pelly) was a fan favorite, playing Teevee's grandmother, a community elder. John Oliver led the cast as Corporal Eric Olsen during the show's first two seasons and entered into an off-screen relationship with co-star Keeper; he left the show when his relationship with Keeper soured. Keeper subsequently became the show's lead actor for the remainder of its run. Oliver was replaced by Robert Bockstael as Corporal Brian Fletcher, who was replaced later by Peter Kelly Gaudreault as Constable James Harper.

One of the stars was Michael Horse, as Andrew One Sky, previously best known for his portrayal of Tonto in the 1981 film The Legend of the Lone Ranger. Tom Jackson also performed as Billy Twofeathers on Shining Time Station.

List of characters

Series
The series ran weekly until 1997, and followed seasonal changes in character arcs:

Season 1
RCMP Corporal Eric Olson moves to Lynx River from an undercover drug operation in Vancouver, becoming acquainted with the town's issues and citizens. Events of note include a physical run-in with local bad boy Trevor Victor "Teevee" Tenia, Eric's divorce from his wife, Michelle coping with an abusive former teacher who bullied her at the residential school, Leon trying to quit drinking (and subsequently marrying Rosie), a girl named Donna struggling with the impacts of fetal alcohol syndrome, Sarah having a romance with Eric, Teevee threatening to air an amateur porno tape he made of Eric and Sarah that he recorded while playing peeping tom in Sarah's window, Teevee running away to Vancouver and having a bad experience with local male prostitute and hustler Nevada, and Michelle trying to cope with the loss of her and Hannah's house in a fire, among other things. Sarah struggles to fit in as a white woman and is at odds with Ellen over the debate of having a natural home birth versus a hospital birth in Yellowknife. Albert Golo is shot by an unknown gunman after Leon and Rey pass out drunk in the cold, and Rey (Leon's best friend) freezes to death. Peter is revealed to have had an affair using Band money to pay for his mistress's accommodations, which Harris had helped to cover up.

Season 2
Season 2's main plot device revolves around the town's dealings with an Italian brother-and-sister duo involved with fashion design who help to fund the building of a tannery in Lynx River. This raises the ire of two liberal animal rights activists who cause conflict regarding animal welfare versus Native ways of hunting and trapping. Gerry invests fifty-thousand dollars (his life's savings) in the tannery at Harris and Peter's goading, while Harris begins a sexual romance with Lois Tenia, much to Teevee's disgust. Teevee himself deals with fatherhood after getting Bertha pregnant, while Sarah has a mental breakdown and becomes lost in the bush. After a stint in a mental hospital, she begins an apparent sexual relationship with Albert, which upsets the other townsfolk. Hannah struggles with being "the Mountie's kid" and begins acting out rebelliously, while Teevee learns how to write grant proposals and raise the morale of the Lynx River children. Eric is horrified after his teenage son, Andy, begins expressing racism towards the Native residents of the town, a bigoted attitude which he apparently picked up from his mother's new boyfriend, Bill. After the Italian siblings are charged with international fraud, the tannery project fails, Gerry loses all of his money, and Rosie begins drinking again. Michelle shoots and kills Andre, a violent man, during a hostage situation.

Season 3
Albert is elected chief of Lynx River, replacing Peter and leaving the town with a serious alcoholism problem. Rosie recovers after a cathartic experience with Sarah on the riverbank, and Gerry reluctantly hires Rosie back to work as his business partner. Betty Moses, an abrasive but kind-hearted woman, attempts to run a treatment centre in town and finds that Sarah is a surprisingly beloved friend of her patients. Bertha returns and shacks up in her grandmother's dilapidated house, where Teevee and their infant daughter gradually move in. Peter struggles with his hopes to move to Ottawa for business in conflict with his desire to stay home, and a pompous artist, Ben Montour, arrives in Lynx River with an alcohol problem, sleeping with Lois, much to Harris's chagrin. Hannah steals a boombox from Gerry's store and Michelle tries to reconcile with her, trying to find out where the bad behaviour is coming from. Olsen is murdered in a shooting while out of town, and his estranged ex-wife arrives with invasive demands, which bothers Sarah and Michelle. Brian Fletcher, a new RCMP officer, takes Olsen's place. Nathan Golo recruits Teevee into bootlegging, Sarah leaves Albert, and Nathan is caught, resulting in him being banned from the community. Teevee is reunited with Nevada, who reveals that he is HIV positive.

Season 4
Sarah gives birth to Albert's child (a daughter named Elizabeth), which puts her in a precarious situation as Albert and her own estranged white family fight over custody of the child. Gerry has a nervous breakdown after a series of unfortunate events befall him, and Rosie learns that Gerry's own family in the Ukraine was impacted by the Holodomor in the 1930s. Nathan begins developing mental health issues due to his ban, and Hannah returns to Lynx River, now wearing punk garb and having a noticeably different attitude. She goes missing in the city, and Michelle searches for her, reuniting with Hannah's father and meeting a man named Andrew One Sky who both aid her. Rosie learns secrets about the murder of her beloved father two decades prior. Brian Fletcher brings his wife, Rosemary (a devout Christian) to Lynx River, where they both struggle with marital problems due to their inability to conceive a child, including a miscarriage that is difficult on both of them. Teevee argues with Bertha after meeting a new partner (Anne-Marie), and Harris and Lois plan to marry. Gerry reveals that he has romantic feelings for Rosie, and Michelle meets Charlie Muskrat, the child of a chronic alcoholic who needs a more supportive place to stay. Michelle also learns that Hannah was killed in a fall from a high bridge, which shatters her emotionally; Rosie's son, Wayne, also struggles deeply with Hannah's loss, while Betty Moses pushes Michelle to get rid of Hannah's belongings as a gesture of letting go of the tragedy, something that Michelle finds intrusive.

Season 5
Teevee invests in a sawmill project to earn an honest living, while Brian and Rosemary consider adopting a child. Michelle becomes a mother figure for Charlie. Sarah struggles with Albert over custody of Elizabeth, and this leads to Joe Gumba deciding to adopt Sarah as his own daughter, which will keep Elizabeth raised in a Dene way but prevent Albert from encroaching on Sarah's parenthood. Andrew One Sky keeps a relationship with Michelle, but decides that he wants to try to run his own business, which Albert attempts to sabotage. Leon goes away on business, leaving Rosie alone. She becomes closer with Gerry, but Gerry then learns that Leon is cheating on her and wonders whether to keep it a secret or not in order to protect Rosie's feelings. Brian expresses lust for Sarah, which Sarah doesn't reciprocate. Brian then becomes increasingly erratic and commits suicide - or so it appears. Albert's house burns down and he disappears, but Sarah believes that the fire was deliberate and that Albert is still alive somewhere. Conflicts arise over the building of a new road and the future of Lynx River, while Charlie deals with his difficult past and traumatic upbringing. Gerry distracts himself from Rosie with a short-lived relationship involving a surly loan officer, who later dumps Gerry for a Revenue Canada employee in a bizarre affair. Nathan Golo grows closer with Sarah but is torn between caring for her and wanting to help Albert.

Season 6
Constable James Harper replaces Brian Fletcher, but Michelle is still suspicious over Brian's inexplicable suicide. The road-building commences in Lynx River, giving Teevee a job, which also leads him to learn about the consequences of radicalism when he gets involved with a leftist group protesting the project and expressing this with violence. Michelle is attacked, leading to an investigation, while Rosie finds out about Leon's cheating and confronts him about it. Lois has a baby, and Manfred and Teevee become struck in a blizzard, forced to huddle together for warmth in order to survive, which oddly brings them closer together as friends. Michelle returns to work but acts strangely around Charlie, leading her to consider quitting her RCMP job. Sarah and Nathan discover disturbing news about Albert when he returns to Lynx River. Gerry considers leaving Lynx River, and reveals more about his troubled past and family to Rosie; the two finally admit to having romantic feelings for one another, sharing a kiss. Peter struggles with the consequences of his tax corruption. Harper finally has the means to arrest Albert, but Albert himself is terminally ill and has different plans for how he wants to go down, confronting Joe Gumba about it.

Character Brian Fletcher's suicide is explored further in subsequent North of 60 follow-up films.

Telefilms
After the end of filming on the series, a series of telemovies were made. From 1999 through 2005 there were five made-for-TV films featuring various members of the show's recurring cast. These movies include In The Blue Ground (1999), Trial by Fire (2000), Dream Storm (2001), Another Country (2003), and Distant Drumming (2005).

Production

A soundtrack album was produced in 1994, including theme music, background music and songs performed by Tom Jackson and others. Other background soundtracks for the series, which were never listed in the credits for the episodes, were generally by Canadian bands and included various samples from Tom Jackson's album No Regrets, as well as "Just Another Day" by Kevin Jordan, "E Uassiuian" by Kashtin, "Honky Tonk Choir Boy" by Chris Ward, "New Orleans Is Sinking" by The Tragically Hip (t-shirts from the band's concert in this particular instance were featured, as character Hannah had attended a concert by The Tragically Hip in Calgary as part of an episode storyline in Season 4), and a number of other songs, mostly unidentified folk rock and country.

This series was filmed in Bragg Creek, Alberta. Its provincial park appears in many episodes as well as the television films. The set for the town of Lynx River itself was a series of facsimile buildings, fully functioning and contained within a small area, designed by Douglas Higgins.

Cultural impact
North of 60 has been listed as an important exploration of Indigenous culture and Canadian life in rural areas, as well as one of few fictional depictions of Indigenous cultures in a thoughtful and realistic way. After the show had ceased airing on television, fans gathered to request re-airings of the existing episodes on television, as well as a DVD video release of all 6 seasons. While no DVD release ever happened, APTN (Aboriginal Peoples Television Network) decided to routinely re-air episodes of North of 60, with APTN CEO Jean La Rose stating, "when the show originally aired in 1992 it became the most popular series in Canadian history, drawing almost a million viewers per week. It’s apparent that fans miss the show and would love to see it back on the air. APTN has been listening and is thrilled to bring the show back to Canadian television!" APTN also offers digital streaming of the series on its own website. 

North of 60 has developed a cult following, including a consistently active but private Facebook group with over 10,000 members, and a fan website featuring interviews from multiple actors and actresses from the show; the website, created by longtime fan Patty Winter, was featured in the university textbook Outside Looking In: Viewing First Nations Peoples in Canadian Dramatic Television Series by Mary Jane Miller.

North of 60 is mostly in Canadian English, although Slavey language, Canadian French and Ukrainian language were incorporated. Lubomir Mykytiuk, who played Gerry Kisilenko, had incorporated Ukrainian language and a song into the show (during character Harris Miller's wedding), and for a scene involving a family scrapbook from the Ukraine, Mykytiuk (who was born in the Ukraine himself) brought in his own family photos for the scene. According to Mykytiuk, "it's a lovely story with the scrapbook because the art director actually called my mum in Montreal and asked whether she had any pictures of me when I was a child. So that helped. It was quite something."

References

External links 

 

First Nations television series
CBC Television original programming
Dene culture
1990s Canadian crime drama television series
1992 Canadian television series debuts
1997 Canadian television series endings
Television shows set in the Northwest Territories
Television series about dysfunctional families
Television series by Alliance Atlantis
Television series by Entertainment One